Caledonia is a village in Caledonia Township, Boone County, Illinois, United States. It is part of the Rockford, Illinois Metropolitan Statistical Area. The population was 183 at the 2020 census.

History
A post office was established as Caledonia Station in 1853 and renamed Caledonia in 1883. Caledonia is a literary name of Scotland. Caledonia Congregational Church was founded in 1894.

Caledonia was struck by an EF-2 tornado on November 22, 2010, around 3:04 pm; several homes were destroyed, a grain bin collapsed, the local Elementary school was set on lockdown, and six minor injuries were reported when a bus was blown over near Argyle and Harlem Roads.

Geography
Caledonia is located at  (42.367850, -88.892538).

Demographics

As of the 2020 census there were 183 people, 89 households, and 50 families residing in the village. The racial makeup of the village was 96.72% White, 0.55% Native American, 0.55% Asian, and 2.19% from two or more races. Hispanic or Latino of any race were 3.28% of the population.

There were 89 households, out of which 39.33% had children under the age of 18 living with them, 43.82% were married couples living together, 4.49% had a female householder with no husband present, and 43.82% were non-families. 16.85% of all households were made up of individuals, and 1.12% had someone who was 65 years of age or older living alone. The average household size was 2.72 and the average family size was 2.19.

The village's age distribution consisted of 17.9% under the age of 18, 10.3% from 18 to 24, 33.9% from 25 to 44, 32.3% from 45 to 64, and 5.6% who were 65 years of age or older. The median age was 35.6 years. For every 100 females, there were 140.7 males. For every 100 females age 18 and over, there were 113.3 males.

The median income for a household in the village was $73,958, and the median income for a family was $103,750. Males had a median income of $58,393 versus $25,625 for females. The per capita income for the village was $41,208. None of the families and 1.5% of the population were below the poverty line, including none of those under age 18 and none of those age 65 or over.

Future development

Caledonia lags behind Poplar Grove in the size of its tax base. Caledonia is approximately three miles east of the new State Highway 173 interchange on Interstate 90, which will position Caledonia to grow its tax base and benefit from increased revenue.

Education
The only school in Caledonia is Caledonia Elementary School, after which students go to one of Belvidere's or Poplar Grove's middle schools.

Notable people
 Glenn W. Birkett, Wisconsin State Assemblyman and farmer, was born in Caledonia.
 John Peterson, farmer, performance artist, entrepreneur, owner of Angelic Organics

See also

 List of municipalities in Illinois

References

External links

 

Villages in Boone County, Illinois
Villages in Illinois
Rockford metropolitan area, Illinois
1853 establishments in Illinois